The following is the complete discography of the German thrash metal band Kreator.

Albums

Studio albums

Live albums

Compilation albums

Video albums

EPs

Singles

Music videos

References 

Heavy metal group discographies
Discography
Discographies of German artists